Castles of Ghana is an album by the American musician John Carter. It was released in 1986. Carter premiered the music at The Public Theater, in November 1985. Carter chose the title after being informed that former Ghanaian castles had been used to hold Africans sold into slavery.

Production
The album was the second part of a five-part series on Black history, titled Roots and Folklore: Episodes in the Development of American Folk Music. The liner notes were written by Carter, who described the atrocity of slavery. Benny Powell played trombone on the album; Andrew Cyrille played drums.

Critical reception

Robert Christgau wrote that "this ain't jazz, it's modern chamber music, quite European in view of its ostensible subject." The New York Times called the album "a powerful jazz composition in its own right and an ideal setting for the composer's hard-edged, penetrating clarinet improvisations."

The Gazette noted that it "is not easy listening," writing that "Carter's compositions are closer to the European brand of improvised jazz, without the rhythmic and harmonic convention usually associated with the music." The Los Angeles Times determined that Carter demonstrates "his amazing facility for jumping from one register to another with an ease that seems to extend the [clarinet]'s naturally capacious range."

The Philadelphia Inquirer listed Castles of Ghana among the 10 best jazz albums of 1986.

Track listing

References

John Carter (jazz musician) albums
1986 albums
Gramavision Records albums